Surya Prakash (1940 – May 22, 2019) was an Indian artist.

References 

Artists from Telangana
2019 deaths
1940 births